John Moore (born 17 March 1950) is a Thoroughbred racehorse trainer.

Moore was born in Sydney, Australia, The son of jockey and trainer George Moore. He began working in Hong Kong racing as an assistant to his father in 1971. In 1985, John Moore took out his trainers license and built a highly successful career for himself in Hong Kong.

Moore won the 2014 Dubai Golden Shaheen with Hong Kong-based Sterling City.   live telecast of 2014 Dubai World Cup broadcast, 2014.03.29

Moore has won the Hong Kong Trainers Premiership five times and in 2005 broke Brian Kan's record for most career wins by a trainer in Hong Kong racing.

The 55 winners he saddled in 2013/14 brought his career total to 1,400.

Performance

References
 Hong Kong Jockey Club linked list of horses trained by John Moore
 The Hong Kong Jockey Club - Trainer profile of John Moore
The Hong Kong Jockey Club 

1950 births
Living people
Hong Kong horse trainers
Sportspeople from Sydney